The 1968 CFL season is considered to be the 15th season in modern-day Canadian football, although it is officially the 11th Canadian Football League season.

CFL News in 1968
J.G. (Jake) Gaudaur was appointed CFL Commissioner and the league adopted a new constitution. Gaudaur would serve in that position until 1984; he is the league's longest-tenured commissioner.

Hamilton Tiger-Cats wide receiver Ted Watkins was shot and killed while allegedly robbing a liquor store in California, shortly before the start of the CFL season.

Regular season standings

Final regular season standings
Note: GP = Games Played, W = Wins, L = Losses, T = Ties, PF = Points For, PA = Points Against, Pts = Points

Bold text means that they have clinched the playoffs.
Saskatchewan and Ottawa have first round byes.

Grey Cup playoffs
Note: All dates in 1968

Conference Semi-Finals

Conference Finals

Playoff bracket

Grey Cup Championship

CFL Leaders
 CFL Passing Leaders
 CFL Rushing Leaders
 CFL Receiving Leaders

1968 CFL All-Stars

Offence
QB – Russ Jackson, Ottawa Rough Riders
RB – George Reed, Saskatchewan Roughriders
RB – Bill Symons, Toronto Argonauts
RB – Vic Washington, Ottawa Rough Riders
TE – Tommy Joe Coffey, Hamilton Tiger-Cats
TE – Herman Harrison, Calgary Stampeders
F – Ken Nielsen, Winnipeg Blue Bombers
C – Ted Urness, Saskatchewan Roughriders
OG – Charlie Parker, Montreal Alouettes
OG – Bill Danychuk, Hamilton Tiger-Cats
OT – Bill Frank, Toronto Argonauts
OT – Clyde Brock, Saskatchewan Roughriders

Defence
DT – Ed McQuarters, Saskatchewan Roughriders
DT – John LaGrone, Edmonton Eskimos
DE – Billy Ray Locklin, Hamilton Tiger-Cats
DE – Ed Harrington, Toronto Argonauts
LB – Wayne Harris, Calgary Stampeders
LB – Wally Dempsey, Saskatchewan Roughriders
LB – Ken Lehmann, Ottawa Rough Riders
DB – Frank Andruski, Calgary Stampeders
DB – Bob Kosid, Saskatchewan Roughriders
DB – Garney Henley, Hamilton Tiger-Cats
DB – Ed Learn, Toronto Argonauts
DB – Marv Luster, Toronto Argonauts

1968 Eastern All-Stars

Offence
QB – Russ Jackson, Ottawa Rough Riders
RB – Bo Scott, Ottawa Rough Riders
RB – Bill Symons, Toronto Argonauts
RB – Vic Washington, Ottawa Rough Riders
TE – Tommy Joe Coffey, Hamilton Tiger-Cats
TE – Mel Profit, Toronto Argonauts
F – Whit Tucker, Ottawa Rough Riders
C – Basil Bark, Montreal Alouettes
OG – Charlie Parker, Montreal Alouettes
OG – Bill Danychuk, Hamilton Tiger-Cats
OT – Bill Frank, Toronto Argonauts
OT – Ellison Kelly, Hamilton Tiger-Cats

Defence
DT – Mike Wadsworth, Toronto Argonauts
DT – Marshall Shirk, Ottawa Rough Riders
DE – Billy Ray Locklin, Hamilton Tiger-Cats
DE – Ed Harrington, Toronto Argonauts
LB – Jerry Campbell, Ottawa Rough Riders
LB – Allen Ray Aldridge Sr., Toronto Argonauts
LB – Ken Lehmann, Ottawa Rough Riders
DB – Larry Fairholm, Montreal Alouettes
DB – Don Sutherin, Ottawa Rough Riders
DB – Garney Henley, Hamilton Tiger-Cats
DB – Ed Learn, Toronto Argonauts
DB – Marv Luster, Toronto Argonauts

1968 Western All-Stars

Offence
QB – Ron Lancaster, Saskatchewan Roughriders
RB – George Reed, Saskatchewan Roughriders
RB – Dave Raimey, Winnipeg Blue Bombers
RB – Jim Evenson, BC Lions
SE – Terry Evanshen, Calgary Stampeders
TE – Herman Harrison, Calgary Stampeders
F – Ken Nielsen, Winnipeg Blue Bombers
C – Ted Urness, Saskatchewan Roughriders
OG – Bob Lueck, Calgary Stampeders
OG – John Atamian, Saskatchewan Roughriders
OT – Ken Sugarman, BC Lions
OT – Clyde Brock, Saskatchewan Roughriders

Defence
DT – Ed McQuarters, Saskatchewan Roughriders
DT – John LaGrone, Edmonton Eskimos
DE – Bill Whisler, Winnipeg Blue Bombers
DE – Dick Suderman, Calgary Stampeders
LB – Wayne Harris, Calgary Stampeders
LB – Wally Dempsey, Saskatchewan Roughriders
LB – Phil Minnick, Winnipeg Blue Bombers
LB – Greg Findlay, BC Lions
DB – Frank Andruski, Calgary Stampeders
DB – Bob Kosid, Saskatchewan Roughriders
DB – Jerry Keeling, Calgary Stampeders
DB – Bruce Bennett, Saskatchewan Roughriders
DB – Ernie Pitts, Winnipeg Blue Bombers

1968 CFL Awards
CFL's Most Outstanding Player Award – Bill Symons (RB), Toronto Argonauts
CFL's Most Outstanding Canadian Award – Ken Nielsen (F), Winnipeg Blue Bombers
CFL's Most Outstanding Lineman Award – Ken Lehmann (LB), Ottawa Rough Riders
CFL's Coach of the Year – Eagle Keys, Saskatchewan Roughriders
 Jeff Russel Memorial Trophy (Eastern MVP) – Larry Fairholm (DB), Montreal Alouettes
 Jeff Nicklin Memorial Trophy (Western MVP) - Ron Lancaster (QB), Saskatchewan Roughriders
 Gruen Trophy (Eastern Rookie of the Year) - Dave Knechtel (DL), Toronto Argonauts
 Dr. Beattie Martin Trophy (Western Rookie of the Year) - Dave Cranmer (RB), Calgary Stampeders
 DeMarco–Becket Memorial Trophy (Western Outstanding Lineman) - Ed McQuarters (DT), Saskatchewan Roughriders

References 

CFL
Canadian Football League seasons